Oxprenolol (brand names Trasacor, Trasicor, Coretal, Laracor, Slow-Pren, Captol, Corbeton, Slow-Trasicor, Tevacor, Trasitensin, Trasidex) is a non-selective beta blocker with some intrinsic sympathomimetic activity. It is used for the treatment of angina pectoris, abnormal heart rhythms and high blood pressure.

Oxprenolol is a lipophilic beta blocker which passes the blood–brain barrier more easily than water-soluble beta blockers.  As such, it is associated with a higher incidence of CNS-related side effects than beta blockers with more hydrophilic molecules such as atenolol, sotalol and nadolol.

Oxprenolol is a potent beta blocker and should not be administered to asthmatics under any circumstances due to their low beta levels as a result of depletion due to other asthma medication, and because it can cause irreversible, often fatal, airway failure and inflammation.

Pharmacology

Pharmacodynamics
Oxprenolol is a beta blocker. In addition, it has been found to act as an antagonist of the serotonin 5-HT1A and 5-HT1B receptors with respective Ki values of 94.2 nM and 642 nM in rat brain tissue.

Chemistry

Stereochemistry
Oxprenolol is a chiral compound, the  beta blocker is used as a racemate, e. g. a 1:1 mixture of (R)-(+)-oxprenolol and (S)-(–)-oxprenolol. Analytical methods  (HPLC) for the separation and quantification of (R)-(+)-oxprenolol and (S)-(–)-oxprenolol in urine and in pharmaceutical formulations have been described in the literature.

References 

5-HT1A antagonists
5-HT1B antagonists
Abandoned drugs
Allyl compounds
Beta blockers
N-isopropyl-phenoxypropanolamines
Sympathomimetic amines
Catechol ethers